Riley Day (born 30 March 2000) is an Australian sprinter. She was selected for the 2020 Summer Olympics in Tokyo and competed in the Women's 200 meters. Day came third in her heat and therefore qualified for the semi-final. She managed a time of 22:56, 0.43 of a second behind the winner Shelly-Ann Frazer-Pryce from Jamaica.

Early years
Riley began her athletics career at the age of nine, when she was entered into her local Little Athletics club in her hometown of Beaudesert, Queensland by her mother. In 2014 at the age of 14, Day ran her first sub-12 100m time. Two years later, in 2016, she ran 23.51 (200m) in the Queensland schools championships and also ran a wind-assisted 11.39 in the 100 meters. Two months later she ran 11.36 (100m) and 23.52 (200m), winning the National schools title.

Achievements
Riley entered the public eye through her performances at the 2017 Nitro Athletics series. She then competed at the 2017 Commonwealth Youth Games in Nassau, Bahamas, winning gold in the 200 metres and silver in the 100 metres. From her performances she was invited to compete in the 200 metres at the 2017 World Championships in Athletics in London.

Riley competed in the women's 200 metres at the 2017 World Championships in Athletics. She placed seventh in her heat with a time of 23.77s.

She competed in the 200 metres at the 2018 Commonwealth Games on the Gold Coast, Australia. She made the semi-finals and ran fourth in her race, in a time of 23.24s. She missed out on a position in the final by 0.01s to Bianca Williams.

References

External links
 

2000 births
Living people
Australian female sprinters
World Athletics Championships athletes for Australia
Athletes (track and field) at the 2018 Commonwealth Games
People from South East Queensland
Commonwealth Games competitors for Australia
Athletes (track and field) at the 2020 Summer Olympics
Olympic athletes of Australia
Olympic female sprinters
21st-century Australian women
Universiade medalists in athletics (track and field)
Universiade silver medalists for Australia